Hannu Rajaniemi (born 9 March 1978) is a Finnish American author of science fiction and fantasy, who writes in both English and Finnish. He lives in Oakland, California, and was a founding director of a commercial research organisation ThinkTank Maths.

Early life
Rajaniemi was born in Ylivieska, Finland in 1978. He holds a BSc in Mathematics from the University of Oulu, a Certificate of Advanced Study in Mathematics from the University of Cambridge and a PhD in Mathematical Physics from the University of Edinburgh. Prior to starting his PhD candidature, he completed his national service as a research scientist for the Finnish Defence Forces.

While pursuing his PhD in Edinburgh, Rajaniemi joined Writers' Bloc, a writers' group in Edinburgh that organizes semi-regular spoken word performances and counts Charlie Stross amongst its members.

Career
Early works included his first published short story "Shibuya no Love" in 2003 and his short story "Deus Ex Homine" in Nova Scotia, a 2005 anthology of Scottish science fiction and fantasy, which caught the attention of his current literary agent, John Jarrold.

Rajaniemi gained attention in October 2008 when John Jarrold secured a three-book deal for him with Gollancz, on the basis of only twenty-four double-spaced pages.
His debut novel, The Quantum Thief, was published in September 2010 by Gollancz in Britain and was published in May 2011 by Tor Books in the U.S. The novel has been nominated for the 2011 Locus Award for Best First Novel. A sequel, The Fractal Prince, was published in September 2012 by Gollancz in Britain, and in October 2012 by Tor in the U.S. The third book in the series is called The Causal Angel, and was published in July 2014 by Gollancz in the U.K. and by Tor in the U.S.

Rajaniemi has stated that the literary works of Jules Verne originally inspired both his career in science, as well as his science-fiction writing. Other influences include Maurice Leblanc, Arthur Conan Doyle and architecture blogger Geoff Manaugh. He also co-founded Helix nanotechnologies.

Awards and honors

 2012 Tähtivaeltaja Award, winner (best science fiction book published in Finnish) for The Quantum Thief.
2011 Science Fiction & Fantasy Translation Awards, winner, Short Form category, translation of Hannu Rajaniemi's "Elegy for a Young Elk".
2011 Locus Award for Best First Novel, nominee, The Quantum Thief
2011 John W. Campbell Memorial Award, third place, The Quantum Thief
2013 John W. Campbell Memorial Award, nominee, The Fractal Prince

Personal life
Rajaniemi lives in San Francisco, California with his wife. Before moving to the U.S., he lived in the United Kingdom for over ten years.

Bibliography

Novels
 Summerland (2018)

The Jean le Flambeur series

 The Quantum Thief (2010)
 Third place, John W. Campbell Memorial Award for Best Science Fiction Novel

 The Fractal Prince (2012)
 The Causal Angel (2014)

Collections
 Words of Birth and Death (2006, Bloc Press), as a limited edition chapbook.
 "The Viper Blanket"
 "Barley Child"
 "Fisher of Men"
 Hannu Rajaniemi: Collected Fiction (2015)

Short fiction

A partial list follows.
 "Shibuya no Love"
 Published in futurismic.com, 2003
 Available online
 "Deus Ex Homine"
 First anthologized in Nova Scotia: New Scottish Speculative Fiction, 2005, 
 The Year's Best Science Fiction 23, 2006, edited by Gardner Dozois, 
 Year's Best SF 11, 2006, edited by David Hartwell and Kathryn Cramer, 
 "His Master's Voice"
 Published in Interzone 218, October 2008
 Available online in English and Finnish
 Audio version available online as a podcast on the Escape Pod (episode #227) and Starship Sofa (Aural Delights No. 98)
 "Elegy for a Young Elk"
 Published in Subterranean, Spring 2010
 Won the award for short from in the 2011 Science Fiction & Fantasy Translation Awards.
 "The Server and the Dragon"
Published in Engineering Infinity, edited by Jonathan Strahan, December 2010
 "Invisible Planets"
Published in Reach for Infinity, edited by Jonathan Strahan, May 2014
 "Unchained: A story of love, loss, and blockchain"
 Published in MIT Technology Review, April 25, 2018.

References

External links
 
 

1978 births
English-language writers
Finnish businesspeople
Finnish male novelists
Finnish male short story writers
Finnish short story writers
Finnish science fiction writers
Living people
University of Oulu alumni
People from Ylivieska
Alumni of the University of Edinburgh
Finnish expatriates in the United States
21st-century Finnish novelists
21st-century male writers
Finnish expatriates in the United Kingdom